Dulowal  is a village in Kapurthala district of Punjab State, India. The village is administrated by a Sarpanch, who is an elected representative.

Demography 
According to the report published by Census India in 2011, Dulowal has a total number of 195 houses and population of 946 of which include 504 males and 442 females. Literacy rate of Dulowal is 74.29%, lower than state average of 75.84%.  The population of children under the age of 6 years is 102 which is  10.78% of total population of Dulowal, and child sex ratio is approximately  645, lower than state average of 846.

As per census 2011, 313 people were engaged in work activities out of the total population of Dulowal which includes 268 males and 45 females. According to census survey report 2011, 75.08% workers describe their work as main work and 24.92% workers are involved in Marginal activity providing livelihood for less than 6 months.

Caste  
The village has schedule caste (SC) constitutes 57.93% of total population of the village and it doesn't have any Schedule Tribe (ST) population.

Population data

Air travel connectivity 
The closest airport to the village is Sri Guru Ram Dass Jee International Airport.

Villages in Kapurthala

External links
  Villages in Kapurthala
 Kapurthala Villages List

References

Villages in Kapurthala district